Luduan (甪端 pinyin: lùduān) is a legendary Chinese auspicious creature. It looks like a deer with green coat, the tail of a horse and a single horn on its head. It can travel 18,000 li (9000 km or 5500 mi) in a single day and speaks all world languages. It appears during the enlightened rule. A legend says a luduan once appeared to Genghis Khan and convinced him to abandon his efforts to conquer India. The throne of the Emperor in the Hall of Supreme Harmony has two incense burners shaped like the luduan as an auspicious symbol.

References

See also
Qilin — another Chinese unicorn.
Xiezhi — a legendary creature able to detect truth
Sin-you — a Japanese legendary creature able to detect truth

Chinese legendary creatures